Lander is an unincorporated community in Farmington Township in Warren County, Pennsylvania, United States.

Notes

Unincorporated communities in Warren County, Pennsylvania
Unincorporated communities in Pennsylvania